Coltrane for Lovers is a compilation album of recordings by American jazz saxophonist-composer John Coltrane, released posthumously on January 23, 2001, by Impulse! and Verve Records. The 11 tracks compiled for the album are all romantic ballads from Coltrane's early years with Impulse!, being recorded during December 1961 to April 1963 at engineer Rudy Van Gelder's recording studio in Englewood Cliffs, New Jersey. Dominated by Coltrane's classic quartet, the sessions also included collaborations with vocalist Johnny Hartman and pianist Duke Ellington.

The recordings on Coltrane for Lovers initially received criticism for Coltrane's stylistic move from complex jazz compositions of the free jazz form to a simpler formula of ballads and blues. In the years since, they gained a legacy as one of Coltrane's most popular recordings and significant in the romantic jazz mode. For their inclusion on Coltrane for Lovers, the tracks were selected by producer Richard Seidel and remastering engineer Allan Tucker at Foothill Digital in New York City.

As the first release in the Verve for Lovers series, Coltrane for Lovers was issued 33 years after Coltrane's death and nearly 40 years after the original recording dates. The album charted at number 10 on Billboard magazine's Top Jazz Albums and was received positively by reviewers, who generally confirmed the popularity and aesthetic value of the recordings.

Background 

Shortly before completing his contract with Atlantic in May 1961, John Coltrane joined the newly formed Impulse! label, with whom the "Classic Quartet" would record. It is generally assumed that the clinching reason Coltrane signed with Impulse! was that it would enable him to work again with recording engineer Rudy Van Gelder,  who had taped his Prestige sessions, as well as Blue Train. It was at Van Gelder's new studio in Englewood Cliffs, New Jersey that Coltrane would record most of his records for the label.

During this period of Coltrane's recording career, critics and fans were fiercely divided in their estimation of Coltrane, who had radically altered his style from bebop to the modal and free jazz styles, as featured on Coltrane (1962), his first studio project for the Impulse! label. John Tynan of Down Beat magazine went so far as to call his playing "anti-jazz." In the midst of this controversy, Coltrane decided to release his next three albums in order to improve the critical perception of himself. In an interview with music journalist Gene Lees, Coltrane was asked of his musical and stylistic change from modal and free jazz to more simplistic forms and standards. He responded by stating "Variety".

John Coltrane's primary record producer, Bob Thiele, who had worked with Coltrane on his previous albums Live! at the Village Vanguard (1961) and Coltrane (1962), acknowledged that the next three Coltrane albums to be released were to be recorded at his behest and as ballad-themed to quiet the negative criticism of Coltrane's more diverse playing. The material chosen for Coltrane's next records would be suited for more slow-tempo, smooth and romantic playing, in contrast to Coltrane's forceful, aggressive style that had dominated his previously issued recordings, and which had led to reviewers describing his playing as "angry".

Recordings and composition 

The recordings featured on Coltrane for Lovers were made between December 1961 and April 1963, during his early years with Impulse! Records. As Thiele intended, these next of Coltrane's releases featured the hard bop form of playing, incorporating influences from rhythm and blues, gospel music, and the blues, especially with the saxophone and piano, and straight-ahead ballads and standards. Ballads, recorded in late 1961 and 1962, was at first criticized as predictable and too simple after the aggressiveness Coltrane displayed on his previous recordings, but was later reevaluated favorably, by some as a masterpiece. On Duke Ellington and John Coltrane, Ellington "sat in" with the John Coltrane Quartet for a set dominated by the pianist's songs. Some performances had Ellington's usual sidemen, bassist Aaron Bell and drummer Sam Woodyard, replacing Jimmy Garrison and Elvin Jones in Coltrane's group.

Recording for the collaboration LP John Coltrane and Johnny Hartman (1963) found the "classic quartet" backing up singer Hartman on ballad standards. Rolling Stone magazine later described the album as "...one of Coltrane's least innovative records, but impeccably dignified and elegant", and music critic Richard S. Ginell commented by saying that "Coltrane's eloquence and the warm, masculine baritone of Hartman can still break your heart." Renowned writer and poet Al Young wrote of the album's most well-known recording, "My One and Only Love", and interpretation of the song by Coltrane and Hartman:

Shortly after the release of his ballad-oriented albums, Coltrane returned to a more experimental phase, recording Impressions (1963) and A Love Supreme (1965). In spite of this, the previous serious of ballad-oriented recordings served in helping increase Coltrane's legacy and influence on romantic jazz.

Compilation and release 

Coltrane for Lovers compiled eleven of the recordings from the aforementioned period seen best fit by the compilation's producers for a romance-themed compilation. The album was released in the United States by the Verve Music Group on January 23, 2001. Thirty three years after Coltrane's death and nearly 40 years after the original recording dates, the album entered the Top Jazz Albums chart and peaked at number 10 on March 3, 2001. It remained on the chart for 63 weeks.

The album served as the first of several other For Lovers compilations that the Verve label would later issue, including recordings by Sarah Vaughan, Chet Baker, and Charlie Parker. A similar compilation, entitled Plays for Lovers, was released by Prestige in 2003. Another Verve compilation of Coltrane ballads, entitled More Coltrane for Lovers, followed in 2005.

Critical reception 
In a four-star review, Allmusic editor Alex Henderson called Coltrane for Lovers "an excellent collection that has no problem reminding us just how warm and expressive his ballad playing could be." After discussing how Coltrane's ballad-playing has been undervalued in comparison to his more experimental recordings, in a December 21, 2001 article for The New York Times, writer Ben Ratliff wrote that "This collection ... presents all the argument you need." Some, however, have criticized the album and Verve negatively for repackaging Coltrane material for an unnecessary cash-in compilation. In  The Penguin Guide to Jazz on CD, Richard Cook and Brian Morton gave the album one out of four stars and commented, "Oh, for goodness' sake! We're tempted to tell you that this contains a previously unreleased rehearsal of Ascension, which we have long regarded as excellent make-out music, but it does not. Needless to say, the music is fine ... It's the concept we have problems with. Avoid."

The recordings compiled for Coltrane for Lovers have endured a legacy as one of Coltrane's best performing and interpreting of ballads and standards. In a September 2000 essay on the recordings, writer Al Young elaborated on John Coltrane's ability during the period of recording the compiled jazz ballads, writing that "The rapport between performer and audience smooths and deepens when a player of John Coltrane's caliber breathes personal expression into some aspect of a song's lyric or meaning." Young continued in his review of the album, stating:

In a 2007 interview for Esquire magazine, author and Coltrane biographer Ben Ratliff praised Coltrane's music and balladry, stating "His work contains most of the well-known ideals of jazz... If you're interested in improvisation, this guy pushed improvisation to the wall. He was the best blues player of his time. He wrote and played incredible ballads. Record companies are still putting out compilations of Coltrane ballads called Coltrane for Lovers or whatever. You can poke fun at the idea, but if you ever listen to one, they're indescribably beautiful."

Track listing 

Track sources
a originally from Coltrane (1962)
b originally from Duke Ellington and John Coltrane (1962)
c originally from Ballads (1962)
d originally from John Coltrane and Johnny Hartman (1963)
e originally from Impressions (1963)

Charts 
Billboard Music Charts (North America) – Coltrane for Lovers
2001: Top Jazz Albums – #10 (63 weeks)

Personnel

Musicians 

John Coltrane – tenor saxophone
Aaron Bell – double bass (tracks: 3, 8)
Duke Ellington – piano (tracks: 3, 8)
Jimmy Garrison – double bass (tracks: 1, 2, 5–7, 9–11)
Johnny Hartman – vocals (tracks: 1, 5, 10)

Roy Haynes – drums (tracks: 7)
Elvin Jones – drums (tracks: 1–6, 9–11)
McCoy Tyner – piano (tracks: 1, 2, 4–7, 9–11)
Reggie Workman – double bass (tracks: 4)
Sam Woodyard – drums (tracks: 8)

Production 

Pamala Cestero – research
GrowingStudio, Bklyn – design
Amelie Hazard – illustrations, cover art
Carlos Kase – research coordination
Peter Keepnews – note editing
Hollis King – art direction
Bryan Koniarz – production coordination
Renee Rosnes – sequencing

Richard Seidel – compilation production
Sherniece Smith – art production
Chuck Stewart – photography
Bob Thiele – original production
Allan Tucker – remastering
Rudy Van Gelder – original engineering
Al Young – liner notes

References

Bibliography

External links 
Coltrane for Lovers at Discogs
Coltrane for Lovers at MusicBrainz

2001 compilation albums
Albums produced by Bob Thiele
Impulse! Records compilation albums
John Coltrane compilation albums
Compilation albums published posthumously
Verve Records compilation albums
Hard bop compilation albums